Eros is the Greek god of love.

Eros may also refer to:

Arts and entertainment

Comics and magazines
 Eros (comics), a superhero appearing in Marvel Comics, better known as Starfox
 Eros (magazine), edited by Ralph Ginzburg who was prosecuted for obscenity in 1962
 Eros Comix, a line of pornographic comic books published by Fantagraphics

Film and television
 Eros, o Deus do Amor, a 1980 film
Eros (film), a 2004 film
 Eros, a fictional character in Ed Wood's Plan 9 from Outer Space (1957)

Music
 Eros (Dün album), the 1981 only album by French band Dün
 Eros Ramazzotti (born 1963), Italian pop musician
 Eros (Eros Ramazzotti album), his 1997 greatest hits album
 Eros (Eve album), a 1999 album by South Korean band Eve
 Eros (Deftones album), an unreleased studio album by American band Deftones, recorded in 2008
 Eros|Anteros, a 2013 album by Belgian band Oathbreaker

Organisations
 Eros Films, a British film distribution company in existence from 1947–1961
 Eros International, an Indian motion picture production and distribution company

Places
 Eros, Arkansas, United States, an unincorporated community
 Eros, Louisiana, United States, a town

People
 Eros (given name), a list of people
 Erős, a list of people with the Hungarian surname
 Reinhard Erös (born 1948), German medical doctor and humanitarian
 Eros Volúsia, Brazilian dancer and actress Heros Volúsia Machado (1914–2004)

Other uses
 Eros (concept), the Greco-Christian term for (especially) romantic or sexual love and the life instinct postulated by Freudian psychology
 Eros (beetle), a genus of beetles
 Eros, the popular (though erroneous) name for the Shaftesbury Memorial Fountain, a monument in Piccadilly Circus, London
 Eros Airport, an airport in Windhoek, Namibia
 433 Eros, a near-Earth asteroid

See also
 EROS (disambiguation)
 ERO (disambiguation)
 Eurus, a wind god in Greek religion